Charles V. Scanlan (January 22, 1893 – May 2, 1964) was an American lawyer and politician from New York.

Personal life
He was born on January 22, 1893, in New York City. He grew up in the Bronx. During World War I, he served in the U.S. Navy. He practiced law in New York City and entered politics as a Republican.

In 1939, he ran unsuccessfully for the New York City Council. He was a member of the New York State Senate (28th D.) from 1947 to 1950, sitting in the 166th and 167th New York State Legislatures. In November 1950, he ran for re-election, but was defeated by Democrat Francis J. McCaffrey. Scanlan was also defeated in 1952 running for the State Senate; and in 1954 and 1958 running for Congress in New York's 24th congressional district.

He died on May 2, 1964, in Calvary Hospital in the Bronx, of cancer.

References

1893 births
1964 deaths
Republican Party New York (state) state senators
20th-century American politicians
Politicians from the Bronx